Giuseppe Milesi Pironi Ferretti (9 March 1817 – 2 August 1873) was an Italian Catholic cardinal and politician of the Holy See.

Early life and career
Ferretti was born on 9 March 1817 in Ancona and was educated there until he joined the Pontifical Academy of Ecclesiastical Nobles. He was ordained in 1842.

He was appointed Catholic Church governor of Ascoli, then Civitavecchia and finally Macerata. He served as pro-legate in both Urbino and Forlì until his appointment as minister of Commerce, Fine Arts and Public Works of the Papal States in 1854.

Cardinalate
Ferretti was elevated to cardinal on 15 March 1858 and served as cardinal at the Basilica of Santa Maria in Aracoeli from his elevation to his appointment as cardinal-bishop.

He was promoted to the position of "president of the Supreme Council of Commerce and Public Works". He served as camerlengo of the Sacred College of Cardinals from 1869 to 1870 and participated in the First Vatican Council.

He served as cardinal bishop of Sabina and bishop of Porto-Santa Rufina from 1870 until his death in 1873.

References

People from Ancona
1817 births
1873 deaths
19th-century Italian cardinals
Cardinals created by Pope Pius IX